Anthony "Tony" Vinciquerra (born August 30, 1954) is an American film executive who is the current Chairman and CEO of Sony Pictures Entertainment. He was previously president and CEO of Fox Networks Group.

Early life
Vinciquerra was born in Albany, New York, and grew up with three sisters in a two-bedroom apartment. He performed various odd jobs in his youth, and began working in radio ad sales in college. He graduated from University at Albany in 1977.

Career 

Vinciquerra began his career in television broadcasting ad sales at local stations and later CBS, and was named COO of Hearst-Argyle Television in 1999. He joined Fox in December 2001 as president of the Fox Television Network. In 2002, he was named president and CEO of Fox Networks Group, which included Fox Cable Networks, Fox Broadcasting, Fox Sports, and Fox International Channels, and he was named chairman in 2008. After leaving Fox in 2011, he spent time as an entertainment consultant and advisor at TPG Capital.

In 2009, Vinciquerra was inducted into the Broadcasting and Cable Hall of Fame. He has sat on the boards of directors at Univision, Pandora Media, Motorola Mobility, DirecTV, and Qualcomm.  

In May 2017, it was announced that Vinciquerra would be filling the role of CEO of Sony Pictures Entertainment, left vacant by Michael Lynton after he announced his departure for Snap Inc. Vinciquerra was hired to oversee the Sony Pictures Motion Picture Group, Sony Pictures Television and worldwide media networks. He is credited with reversing a downward trend of film box office performances, as well as strengthening the television division.

In his role overseeing Sony Pictures Television, Vinciquerra was involved in the hirings of Mike Richards and Mayim Bialik as co-moderators of the television quiz show Jeopardy! in 2021 after the death of longtime host Alex Trebek. Before any of his episodes aired, Richards stepped down from his position after several insensitive comments made on his podcast emerged. Vinciquerra helped manage the resumed host search, which concluded in July 2022 with deals for Bialik and Ken Jennings as the show's rotating co-hosts.

Personal life 
In 2001, Vinciquerra moved to Los Angeles and met his wife, Toni Knight, an advertising executive who now owns her own firm. They have three children together. They divorced in 2020.

References

External links 

Living people
American business executives
1954 births
Film distributors (people)
Sony Pictures Entertainment people
University at Albany, SUNY alumni